Amanita veldiei is a species of Amanita found in South Africa

References

External links

veldiei